Anglim is a surname. Notable people with the surname include:

Mário Roberto Emmett Anglim (1922–1973), American Roman Catholic bishop
Paule Anglim (1923–2015), Canadian gallerist, art dealer and curator
Philip Anglim (born 1953), American actor
Paddy Anglim (1906–1954), Jumped the Long Jump for Ireland in the 1928 Olympics in Amsterdam

Anglim is also a modern Hebrew term for English-speaking primarily American Jews - either immigrants to Israel living in closed English-speaking communities, or as a temporary population of visitors to the country during Jewish festivals.